The bushveld elephant shrew or bushveld sengi (Elephantulus intufi) is a species of elephant shrew in the family Macroscelididae. It is found in Angola, Botswana, Namibia, and South Africa. Its natural habitats are subtropical or tropical dry shrubland and hot deserts.

Behavior
The bushveld elephant shrew live in monogamous pairs within their own territory away from other pairs which can be attributed as a result of male mate guarding. Even though they live as monogamous pairs, the bushveld elephant shrew experience weak pair bonds.

According to the journal “Social Structure of the Bushveld Sengi (Elephantulus Intufi) in Namibia and the Evolution of Monogamy in the Macroscelidea” written by G. B. Rathburn and C.D. Rathburn, the behavioral ecology of elephant shrews is best understood in the context of their evolutionary history. There is strong evidence that their phylogeny is due to Macroscelidea which is part of a monophyletic African clade of mammals that represents one of four early eutherian radiations.

References

Elephant shrews
Mammals described in 1836
Taxonomy articles created by Polbot